The North Berks Football League is a football competition in England.  The league was founded in 1908. It has a total of five divisions, with Division One sitting at level 12 of the English football league system. The vast majority of clubs are based in the administrative county of Oxfordshire but most are within the boundaries of the historic county of Berkshire.

For the 2021–22 season there were 10 clubs competing in Division One.

2022–23 Members

Division One
Abingdon United Development 
Berinsfield
Cholsey United 
Drayton 
East Hendred
Frilsham & Yattendon 
Long Wittenham Athletic
Milton United Reserves 
Stanford-in-the-Vale
Steventon

Division Two
Burghclere
Compton
Dorchester 
East Hendred Reserves
Lambourn Sports 
Letcombe Reserves
Long Wittenham Athletic Reserves
Sutton Courtenay
Watlington Town Reserves 
Woodcote Development

Division Three
Benson Lions
Berinsfield Reserves
Compton Reserves
Ditcot Town Youth 
Drayton Reserves
Kingston Colts 
Marcham 
Stanford-in-the-Vale Reserves
Steventon Reserves
Sutton Courtenay Reserves 
Uffington United 
Wantage Town 'A'

List of Champions since 1970

External links
 Official website
 North Berks League on Full-Time for 2013-14 season

 
1908 establishments in England
Football leagues in England
Sports leagues established in 1908
Football in Oxfordshire
Football in Berkshire